Emanino (Emanin) is a rural locality (a village) in Bedeyevo-Polyansky Selsoviet, Blagoveshchensky District, Bashkortostan, Russia. The population was 79 as of 2010. There is 1 street.

Geography 
Emanino is located 84 km northeast of Blagoveshchensk (the district's administrative centre) by road. Bulychevo is the nearest rural locality.

References 

Rural localities in Blagoveshchensky District